Big Eddy may refer to:

 Big Eddy, Kentucky, a community in Franklin County, Kentucky
 Big Eddy Site, an archaeological site in Cedar County, Missouri
 Big Eddy, Alberta, a specialized municipality
 The Juan de Fuca Eddy ecosystem, also known as the "Big Eddy"

See also
Big Ed (disambiguation)